

Capri Anderson (born Christina Walsh on March 30, 1988) is an American pornographic actress.

Background
Walsh was born of Irish and Welsh descent. She was raised in New York City, New York as well in Florida. She has experience in dance, equestrian and fashion.

Career
Walsh entered the industry at age 18, after responding to a Craigslist ad seeking to cast couples. After moving from Bronx, New York to Los Angeles, California, she made her debut in 2007 under the name Alexis Capri.

In 2011, under the name Capri Anderson, she played Mary Jane Watson in Spider-Man XXX: A Porn Parody. In 2012, Anderson performed in Pee-Wee's XXX Adventure: A Porn Parody, earning her the 2013 AVN Award for Best Supporting Actress.

Legal issues
On October 26, 2010, Anderson was involved in a highly publicized scandal with Charlie Sheen. Sheen caused $7,000 worth of damage to a room at New York City’s Plaza Hotel, and police found Anderson locked in the bathroom, which she said she did to escape Sheen. She remained quiet about the situation until November 2010, when Sheen sued her for extortion, saying she asked for $1 million to keep her story out of the press. Anderson then gave an exclusive interview to ABC News, stating that Sheen was intoxicated and threatened to kill her.

Filmography

Awards
 2013: Best Supporting Actress for Pee-Wee’s XXX Adventure: A Porn Parody

References

External links

 

1988 births
Actresses from New York City
American pornographic film actresses
Living people
Pornographic film actors from New York (state)
21st-century American women